Apostibes is a genus of moths in the family Scythrididae.

Species
Apostibes aerata Walsingham, 1914
Apostibes afghana Passerin d'Entrèves & Roggero, 2003
Apostibes deckerti Bengtsson, 2014
Apostibes dhahrani Passerin d'Entrèves & Roggero, 2003
Apostibes griseolineata Walsingham, 1907
Apostibes halmyrodes (Meyrick, 1921)
Apostibes inota (Meyrick, 1924)
Apostibes mesopora Walsingham, 1914
Apostibes nivisignata Walsingham, 1914
Apostibes raguae Bengtsson, 1997
Apostibes samburensis Bengtsson, 2014

References

 , 2010: Notes on Scythrididae from the Turanian region, with descriptions of six new species (Lepidoptera: Scythrididae). Shilap Revista de Lepidopterologica 38 (151): 267-285.

Scythrididae